Windmaker Lake is located in Glacier National Park, in the U. S. state of Montana. Swiftcurrent Mountain is west and Mount Wilbur is north of the lake. Unnamed creeks and the melt from the North Swiftcurrent Glacier feed the lake. Windmaker Lake can be reached by way of the Swiftcurrent Pass Trail.

See also
List of lakes in Glacier County, Montana

References

Lakes of Glacier National Park (U.S.)
Lakes of Glacier County, Montana